The mullet is a hairstyle in which the hair is cut shorter at the front, top and sides, but is longer at the back.

Etymology
According to the Oxford English Dictionary, use of the term mullet to describe this hairstyle was "apparently coined, and certainly popularized, by American hip-hop group the Beastie Boys", who used "mullet" and "mullet head" as epithets in their 1994 song "Mullet Head", combining it with a description of the haircut: "number one on the side and don't touch the back, number six on the top and don't cut it wack, Jack." They expounded on the subject at length in a six-page article entitled "Mulling Over The Mullet" in Issue 2 (1995) of their magazine Grand Royal, offering a selection of alternative names for the cut, including "Hockey Player Haircut" and "Soccer Rocker".

False etymology
On Slate'''s Decoder Ring podcast, Willa Paskin discussed the etymology of the term, noting that Oxford English Dictionary credited the Australian Street Machine automotive magazine with the first published description of the term in 1992, predating Beastie Boys. Decoder Ring discovered that the magazine image had been faked; in a 2018 apology posted to imgur, the creator had admitted to faking the text, adjusting the magazine dates, and shown proof.

In popular culture claims
In 2019, Kiefer Sutherland was widely reported,Kiefer Sutherland very apologetic about The Lost Boys mullet newsgroove, 24 October 2019. Retrieved 22 January 2022 based on an interview with Yahoo!, to be the unwitting instigator of the style due to the director's requirements for his lead role in the 1987 film The Lost Boys. He also confirmed part of the inspiration for his hairstyle came from Billy Idol. In 2022 press interviews marking the 35th anniversary of the film, Sutherland again recounted the story.Kiefer Sutherland Celebrates 35th Anniversary Of ‘The Lost Boys' ET Canada. Retrieved 22 January 2022

Fashion history
 Mullets in antiquity 
A metal figurine, dated back to the 1st-century AD and found during 2018 preparations for a new car park at the Wimpole Estate, England, was hypothesised by archaeologists to indicate that natives in ancient Britain during the Roman occupation could have worn their hair similarly to mullets.

In the sixth century, Byzantine scholar Procopius wrote that some factions of young males wore their hair long at the back and cut it short over the forehead. This non-Roman style was termed the "Hunnic" look.

Researcher Alan Henderson describes the ancient hairstyle as useful, as it kept the hair out of the eyes, yet provided warmth and protection for the neck.

Native America
In Mourt's Relation, author Edward Winslow described the Plymouth pilgrims' first encounter with the Native Americans, Samoset of the Abenaki in 1621:

1960s
Tom Jones sported a mullet in two of his three 1965 performances of his hit song "It's Not Unusual" on the Ed Sullivan Show, May 2, 1965 and June 13, 1965.

1970s

Mullets were worn by rock stars David Bowie, Rod Stewart, Keith Richards, and Paul McCartney in the early 1970s. When writing Neil Peart's eulogy in January 2020, Greg Prato asserted Peart had a mullet, based on his observations of a 1974 video, further suggesting "he also may have been one of the first rockers to sport another hairstyle –  the rattail", based on a 1985 video, "The Big Money".

1980s

In Australia, the United States and the United Kingdom in the 1980s, mullets were "everywhere", according to Tess Reidy writing at The Guardian in 2019. The 1980s were also the high point of the mullet's popularity in continental Europe.

Also in the 1980s, the mullet became part of lesbian culture, where it came to be used as a way of identifying oneself as a member of that culture in public.

1990s

After the much-publicized 1992 DC Comics storyline in which Superman apparently died, the character returned to the 1993 follow-up storyline "Reign of the Supermen", in which he was depicted with a mullet. The cancelled Superman film project, Superman Lives, would have depicted Superman with a mullet.

Punk rock band the Vandals sang of the mullets worn by country music singers and guests of The Jerry Springer Show and listed regional names for the style in the 1998 song "I've Got an Ape Drape".

Vocalist Wesley Willis wrote and released the track "Cut the Mullet" in 1998 and frequently performed it at live shows.

2000s
The 2001 film American Mullet documents the phenomenon of the mullet hairstyle and the people who wear it.

The same year Universal Records (Canada) released the album Mullet Years: Power Ballads'', a collection of hard rock ballads.

This hairstyle became popular with the bogan subculture in Australia and New Zealand.

2010s 
The mullet was banned in Iran as one style on a list of "un-Islamic", "decadent Western cuts".

The mullet was returned to the spotlight in 2015 by K-pop idol G-Dragon during his band BIGBANG's Made World Tour. Byun Baekhyun of EXO also sported a mullet in promotion for the group's 2017 song "Ko Ko Bop". K-pop artists who have worn mullets include Block B's Zico, Song Min-ho, Nam Joo-hyuk, Dean, Stray Kids' Chan and Han, VIXX's N, B.A.P.'s Himchan, Seventeen's Woozi and The8, and BTS's V.

The mullet has also experienced a revival within American sports.  After winning back-to-back Stanley Cups, Phil Kessel was spotted in Pittsburgh Penguins training camp in September 2017 bringing the mullet back to its native roots of Pittsburgh Hockey. Similarly, Oklahoma State head football coach Mike Gundy wore a mullet starting in early 2017; the popularity of his mullet supposedly earned Oklahoma State millions of dollars in marketing revenue. In addition, from 2010 to 2015, Patrick Kane of the Chicago Blackhawks popularized the "playoff mullet," an alternative to the traditional NHL playoff beard. Current Pittsburgh Steelers running back James Conner began sporting a mullet in 2018, continuing the Yinzer tradition of the hairstyle in Western Pennsylvania. The revival also extended to Australia in the late 2010's, with Australian football player Rhyan Grant becoming widely known for his mullet haircut to the point that it was included within the video game FIFA 20.

2020s 
In September 2020, i-D called 2020 "the year of the mullet", attributing its boom in popularity to COVID-19 lockdowns and their closing of hair salons. In an article for Vice Media, the mullet-wearing teenagers interviewed all described getting the haircut as a joke, with one stating "There's an irony to the mullet haircut. It's this disgustingly gross haircut, which means it's definitely worn in an ironic way". Magda Ryczko, founder of the queer-owned barbershop Hairrari in Brooklyn, notes that mullets allow for a professional front-facing look for COVID-19 era Zoom meetings, while maintaining a messier, more fun look off-camera, when the longer back section of hair may be revealed. An annual national USA Mullet Championship began in 2020.

Like many '90s trends, mullets have made their way back into mainstream hairstyles. The most popular version is called the mullet fade. The versatility of the taper fade has modernized the classic mullet, giving it a cleaner look.

See also
 List of hairstyles

References

Further reading

External links
 
 

1960s fashion
1970s fashion
1980s fashion
1990s fashion
2000s fashion
2010s fashion
2020s fashion
American fashion
Australian fashion
British fashion
Canadian fashion
New Zealand fashion
Hairstyles